Titus Quinctius Poenus (Pennus) Cincinnatus was a consul of the Roman Republic in 431 and 428 BC and a consular tribune in 426 BC. He might have been consular tribune again in 420 BC.

Quinctius belonged to the powerful Quinctia gens and was the son of one of the early republics most famous figures, the twice appointed dictator Lucius Quinctius Cincinnatus. He was probably the younger brother of Lucius Quinctius Cincinnatus, consular tribune in 431 BC. Filiations indicate that he is the father of Titus Quinctius Cincinnatus Capitolinus, consular tribune in 388 BC.

Career 
Quinctius was elected consul in 431 BC together with Gaius Julius Mento. Escalations of the war with Aequi and Volsci led to the appointment of a dictator, Aulus Postumius Tubertus, who successfully defeated their combined forces at Mount Algidus. Quinctius held the command of one of the legions under the dictator, while his colleague Julius remained in the city.

Quinctius held the consulship for a second time, this in 428 BC. His colleague was Aulus Cornelius Cossus. There are several conflicting descriptions on the events during the consulship, which mostly revolves around the actions and deeds of Cossus. Plutarch and Festus places the exploits of Cossus in this year, which would see him win the spoila opima and a triumph, while most other ancient authors, such as Livy, places the event in 437 BC. Livy instead places the appointment of a special commission in this year with the mission to investigate the participation of Fidenae in the Veientane raids on Roman territory. The commission consisted of Lucius Sergius Fidenas, Quintus Servilius Priscus Structus Fidenas and Mamercus Aemilius Mamercinus.

Cossus and Quinctius would again share the imperium when in 426 BC they together with Gaius Furius Pacilus Fusus and Marcus Postumius Albinus Regillensis were elected as consular tribunes. The year saw the continuation of the war with Veii and Fidenae and the appointment of a dictator, Mamercus Aemilius Mamercinus. He appointed Cossus as his magister equitum and Quinctius as legatus. As a legatus he led troops against the Veii. The war was successful for the Romans and Fidenae was recaptured, earning a triumph for Aemilius. 

Quinctius, or his brother Lucius, was elected as consular tribune in 420 BC. Livy and the Chronograph of 354 has Lucius Quinctius, while the Fasti Capitolini points towards Titus Quinctius. Scholars generally favor Lucius Quinctius as the consular tribune of 420 BC and that the Fasti has confused the two brothers. The college, including Quinctius, consisted of Lucius Furius Medullinus, Aulus Sempronius Atratinus and Marcus Manlius Vulso. Little is known of the events during the year other than that Sempronius presided over the election of the Quaestors.

See also

References 

5th-century BC Roman consuls
Quinctii